The 1985 Cleveland mayoral election took place on November 5, 1985, to elect the Mayor of Cleveland, Ohio. The election was officially nonpartisan, with the top two candidates from the October 1 primary advancing to the general election. 

Voinovich's top opponent was council member Gary Kucinich, brother of former mayor Dennis Kucinich. , this was the last time a Republican was elected Mayor of Cleveland.

Primary election

General election

References

1980s in Cleveland
Cleveland mayoral
Cleveland
Mayoral elections in Cleveland
Non-partisan elections
November 1985 events in the United States